Death by Stereo is the seventh studio album by Umphrey's McGee.  The album was released on September 13, 2011.

Track listing 

Total runtime: 41:34

Bonus tracks

References 

Umphrey's McGee albums
2011 albums